Warszawa Gołąbki railway station is a railway station in the Ursus district of Warsaw, Poland. The station is served by Koleje Mazowieckie, who run trains from Kutno to Warszawa Wschodnia.

The neighbourhood of Gołąbki (pl) was nominally a village in the present-day Warsaw West County. It was incorporated into the town of Ursus in 1954, which became a district of Warsaw in 1977. Notable points of interest include the Church of St. John the Apostle and Evangelist pictured.

References

External links 
 
Station article at kolej.one.pl

Golabki
Railway stations served by Koleje Mazowieckie
Ursus, Warsaw